The Speed of Sound is the second extended play by Australian boy band In Stereo (Jakob Delgado, Ethan Karpathy and Chris Lanzon). It was released on 1 July 2016.

Background
In 2015, In Stereo auditioned for season 7 of The X Factor Australia and made it to the top 12. The group were eliminated in week 4, coming in eighth place.

Following the elimination, the trio signed a record deal with Warner Music Australia and released their first extended play She's Rock n Roll on 1 April 2016, which peaked at number 11 on the ARIA Chart.
The Speed of Sound is the group's second EP.

The group supported the EP with an Australian tour throughout July 2016.

Track listing

Charts

Release history

References

2016 EPs